WBVE is a Classic Rock formatted broadcast radio station licensed to Bedford, Pennsylvania, serving Bedford and Bedford County in Pennsylvania.  WBVE is owned and operated by Cessna Communications, Inc.

References

External links
B-Rock 107.5

1988 establishments in Pennsylvania
Classic rock radio stations in the United States
Radio stations established in 1988
BVE